The 2007 Cologne Centurions season was the fourth and final season for the franchise in the NFL Europa League (NFLEL). The team were led by head coach David Duggan in his second year and played its home games at RheinEnergieStadion in Cologne, Germany. When Duggan gave up coaching after week nine due to health issues, defensive coordinator John Lyons was elevated to the position of interim head coach for the final game. They finished the season in third place with a record of six wins and four losses. The National Football League (NFL) announced the closure of its European branch on June 29.

Offseason

Free agent draft

Personnel

Staff

Roster

Schedule

Standings

Game summaries

Week 1: at Hamburg Sea Devils

Week 2: vs Frankfurt Galaxy

Week 3: at Rhein Fire

Week 4: vs Berlin Thunder

Week 5: at Berlin Thunder

Week 6: vs Rhein Fire

Week 7: at Amsterdam Admirals

Week 8: vs Hamburg Sea Devils

Week 9: vs Amsterdam Admirals

Week 10: at Frankfurt Galaxy

Honors
After the completion of the regular season, the All-NFL Europa League team was selected by the NFLEL coaching staffs, members of a media panel and fans voting online at NFLEurope.com. Overall, Cologne had eight players selected, tying for the most with Hamburg. The selections were:

 Bobby Blizzard, tight end
 Greg Eslinger, center
 Philippe Gardent, linebacker
 Jason Hall, defensive end
 Kevin House, cornerback
 Chris Reis, safety
 Derrick Ross, running back
 Kevin Vickerson, defensive tackle

Additionally, Hall and Ross were named defensive and co-offensive MVPs, respectively. Hall set a franchise record with 12 sacks and anchored the Centurions defense which ranked first in total yards allowed (2,561) and total points allowed (172). He also tied a league record by recording a sack in seven consecutive games. Ross, who shared the award with Frankfurt's quarterback J. T. O'Sullivan, was the NFLEL's leading rusher with 802 yards and four 100-yard games. He also totaled a league-best 933 yards from scrimmage (802 rushing, 131 receiving) and scored five touchdowns.

Notes

References

Cologne
Cologne Centurions (NFL Europe) seasons